State Highway 127 (SH 127) is a  state highway in far northern Colorado.

Route description
SH 127 begins in the south at its junction with SH 125 roughly four miles north of Cowdrey and proceeds generally northeast to the Wyoming state line where it becomes Wyoming Highway 230 towards Laramie, WY.

Major intersections

See also

 List of state highways in Colorado

References

External links

127
Transportation in Jackson County, Colorado